Simeon Georgiev (born 23 December 1945) is a Bulgarian boxer. He competed in the men's middleweight event at the 1968 Summer Olympics.

References

External links
 

1945 births
Living people
Bulgarian male boxers
Olympic boxers of Bulgaria
Boxers at the 1968 Summer Olympics
Sportspeople from Varna, Bulgaria
Middleweight boxers